The 1991–92 Washington State Cougars men's basketball team represented Washington State University for the 1991–92 NCAA Division I men's basketball season. Led by fifth-year head coach Kelvin Sampson, the Cougars were members of the Pacific-10 Conference and played their home games on campus at Beasley Coliseum in Pullman, Washington.

There was no conference tournament this season; last played in 1990, it resumed in 2002.

For the first time, Washington State played in the National Invitation Tournament, and advanced to the

Postseason results

|-
!colspan=5 style=| National Invitation Tournament

References

External links
Sports Reference – Washington State Cougars: 1991–92 basketball season

Washington State Cougars men's basketball seasons
Washington State Cougars
Washington State Cougars
Washington State
Washington State